Thistleberry is a ward of the Borough of Newcastle-under-Lyme, located west of Newcastle town centre, in the county of Staffordshire, England. In 2021 it had a population of 5649.

References 

Wards of the Borough of Newcastle-under-Lyme